Luis Antonio Martínez Jiménez (born April 29, 1987, in Zacapoaxtla, Puebla, Mexico) is a former Mexican professional footballer.

External links

1987 births
Living people
Association football midfielders
C.D. Veracruz footballers
Liga MX players
Ascenso MX players
Footballers from Puebla
Mexican footballers